Teaching in Higher Education is a peer-reviewed academic journal publishing articles that offer critical perspectives on teaching in the setting of higher education. It was established in 1996 and is published eight times per year by Taylor & Francis. The founding editor-in-chief was Len Barton (UCL Institute of Education), and the current one is Peter Kahn (University of Liverpool, UK). According to the Journal Citation Reports, the journal has a 2020 impact factor of 3.008, ranking it 78th out of 265 journals in the category "Education & Educational Research".

References

External links

Official blog of the journal

Education journals
Publications established in 1996
Taylor & Francis academic journals
English-language journals
8 times per year journals